Levon James is a retail mixtape by American rapper King Von from Chicago. It was released through Only the Family Entertainment/Empire on March 6, 2020. Executively produced by Chopsquad DJ, it features guest appearances from Lil Durk, Booka600, G Herbo, NLE Choppa, Tee Grizzley, YNW Melly and Yungeen Ace. The project peaked at number 40 on the Billboard 200.

Track listing

Charts

References

2020 albums
Empire Distribution albums
King Von albums